The Argentina Women's Hockey National Tournament is the field hockey national competition for women, whose format for qualification and final tournament is similar to the men's. It has been held since 2009. The tournament has been organized by the Argentine Hockey Confederation (CAH). Since 2009, it has been held regularly once every year, in the same year as the men's competition.

The tournament has always featured eight teams.

The 2021 tournament was held in Rosario, Argentina from 14 to 17 October, with Buenos Aires winning after beating Córdoba 6–2 in the final.

Results

Summaries

Team appearances

References

 
Women's field hockey competitions in Argentina
2009 establishments in Argentina